Sandra L. "Sandy" Pappas (born June 15, 1949) is a Minnesota politician and former President of the Minnesota Senate. A member of the Minnesota Democratic–Farmer–Labor Party (DFL), she represents District 65, which includes parts of Saint Paul in Ramsey County in the Twin Cities metropolitan area.

Early life and education
Pappas was born in Hibbing, Minnesota. She attended the University of Minnesota and Metropolitan State University, from which she earned a B.A. in public policy in 1986. She later attended the John F. Kennedy School of Government at Harvard University, earning an MPA.

Minnesota House of Representatives
Pappas was a member of the Minnesota House of Representatives, representing District 65B from 1985 to 1991.

Minnesota Senate
Pappas was elected to the Minnesota Senate in 1990 and has been reelected in every election since. She has served on the Capital Investment, Commerce, Finance, Rules and Administration, and State and Local Government Committees. She chaired the Higher Education Committee from 2007 to 2011 the Education Committee from 2001 to 2003. She served as president pro tempore from 2003 to 2007.

After the DFL regained a majority in the 2012 election, Pappas was elected by her caucus to serve as President of the Minnesota Senate, starting in January 2013. Pappas was reelected to the Senate in 2016, 2020, and 2022.

1997 Saint Paul mayoral campaign
Pappas ran an unsuccessful campaign for mayor of Saint Paul against incumbent Norm Coleman in 1997.

Personal life
Pappas is married to Neal Gosman. They have three children and 31 grandchildren. She is Jewish.

References

External links

Official Senate website
Official campaign website
Project Vote Smart - Senator Sandy Pappas Profile
Follow the Money - Sandy Pappas Campaign Contributions
2006 2004 2002 2000 1996

|-

|-

1949 births
Harvard Kennedy School alumni
Living people
Presidents of the Minnesota Senate
Democratic Party Minnesota state senators
Democratic Party members of the Minnesota House of Representatives
People from Hibbing, Minnesota
Politicians from Saint Paul, Minnesota
Women state legislators in Minnesota
21st-century American politicians
21st-century American women politicians
Metropolitan State University alumni
Jewish American state legislators in Minnesota